Josh Hannay (born 11 January 1980) is an Australian professional rugby league coach who is an assistant coach of the Cronulla-Sutherland Sharks in the NRL and a former professional rugby league footballer who played as a  in the 1990s and 2000s.

A Queensland State of Origin representative, Hannay spent nine seasons with the North Queensland Cowboys and was the club's highest point scorer until 2011. He later had stints with the Cronulla-Sutherland Sharks and Celtic Crusaders, before moving into coaching.

In 2020, he served as the interim head coach of the Cowboys in the National Rugby League.

Background
Born and raised in Moranbah, Queensland, Hannay played his junior rugby league for the Moranbah Miners before being signed by the North Queensland Cowboys at 15. In Townsville, he attended Townsville Grammar School.

Playing career

North Queensland Cowboys
In Round 15 of the 1996 ARL season, Cowboys' head coach Graham Lowe named Hannay to make his first grade debut against the Western Suburbs Magpies. At 16 years and 185 days old, Hannay would have been the second youngest player to debut in Australian history after Ray Stehr, who debuted at 16 years and 85 days in 1929. The selection was ultimately blocked by the Australian Rugby League (ARL), as Hannay (who was born in 1980), had to turn 17 the year he debuted to be eligible.

In Round 3 of the 1998 NRL season, almost two years after his vetoed debut, the now 18-year old Hannay made his NRL debut in the Cowboys' 16–15 win over the Parramatta Eels, scoring a try. In Round 23, he scored his first NRL hat-trick in a 12–28 loss to the Manly Warringah Sea Eagles. In 1999, despite playing just 13 games due to injuries, he represented the Junior Kangaroos alongside his Cowboys teammate Scott Prince.

Over the next two seasons, Hannay was further plagued by injuries, playing only 17 games, including just five in 2000. In 2002, he played his first full season in four years, starting in 19 games for the Cowboys and finishing as their top point scorer.

In 2003, Hannay enjoyed a breakout season, playing 23 games and scoring 230 points, second in the NRL only to Hazem El Masri's 294. In Round 23 of the 2003 season, Hannay set the record for most points (24) and most goals (10) in a single game for the Cowboys in their 60–8 win over the South Sydney Rabbitohs. As of 2020, his 10-goal record still stands, while Johnathan Thurston later equalled his points record in 2006.

He scored 228 points that season, finishing second again in the top point scorers list to El Masri, who scored 342.

In 2006, Hannay fell out of favour at the Cowboys, playing just nine games. In July, he was told by the club he would not be re-signed when his contract ended that season. Despite this, Hannay earned a recall to the Queensland side, starting at centre in their series-deciding 16–14 win over New South Wales at the Telstra Dome in Melbourne. On 26 July 2006, he signed a two-year deal with the Cronulla-Sutherland Sharks.

Cronulla-Sutherland Sharks
In Round 1 of the 2007 NRL season, Hannay made his debut for the Sharks in an 18–0 win over the Penrith Panthers. He would play just two more games before being dropped to New South Wales Cup by head coach Ricky Stuart. In June 2007, he was dropped from the Sharks' NSW Cup side and began playing for the Gymea Gorillas in the local Cronulla-Sutherland District competition before being granted a release by the club.

Celtic Crusaders
In August 2007, Hannay signed the Celtic Crusaders, who were playing in the National League Two, helping them to promotion to the National League One. In 2008, he was a member of the Crusaders' side who lost to Salford City in the National League One Grand Final. Despite losing the Grand Final, the Crusaders finished second and earned promotion to the Super League for the first time. In 2009, he played 17 Super League games for the Crusaders, finishing as the club's top point scorer.

Hannay did not get to finish the season, as he, along with Australian teammates Jace Van Dijk, Tony Duggan, Damien Quin, Darren Mapp and Mark Dalle Cort were deported after the UK Border Agency ruled they breached visa regulations. Hannay was banned from entering the United Kingdom for 10 years and his Crusaders' contract was cancelled with immediate effect.

Later career
In November 2009, Hannay returned to Australia, joining the Mackay Cutters in the Queensland Cup for the 2010 season.

In 2011, he returned to Moranbah to play for his junior club, the Moranbah Miners, in the Mackay and Districts A-Grade competition. In 2012, he captain-coached the club to premiership success in the competition. In 2013, he retired from playing and solely focused on coaching the Miners.

Coaching career

Souths Logan Magpies
On 9 October 2013, Hannay was appointed head coach of the Souths Logan Magpies in the Queensland Cup for the 2014 season. Over three seasons with the club, Hannay's highest place finish with the Magpies was 7th in 2016, missing the finals on points differential. He coached 70 games, winning 28, for a 40% winning percentage. In 2016 and 2017, he coached the Queensland under-18 rugby league team, losing both games to New South Wales.

North Queensland Cowboys
In 2017, he returned to the North Queensland Cowboys as an assistant coach to Paul Green. In his first season on the coaching staff, the Cowboys qualified for the NRL Grand Final, losing to the Melbourne Storm. In 2018, he joined the Queensland coaching staff as an assistant to Kevin Walters, spending just one year in the role.

On 20 July 2020, Hannay was named as the interim head coach of the North Queensland Cowboys following the resignation of Paul Green. In Round 17 of the 2020 NRL season, after five straight losses, Hannay earned his first win as an NRL head coach after the Cowboys defeated the St George Illawarra Dragons 23–22 in golden point. On 22 September 2020, after being overlooked as full-time head coach of the Cowboys, Hannay announced he would leave the club, despite being under contract for the 2021 season.

Cronulla-Sutherland Sharks
On 17 November 2020, Hannay joined the Cronulla-Sutherland Sharks as an assistant coach. On 14 April 2021 Hannay was named as caretaker head coach following the sacking of John Morris

In round 11 of the 2021 NRL season, he earned his first win as Cronulla-Sutherland interim coach as the club defeated fierce rivals St. George Illawarra 13–12.

Hannay is currently an assistant coach with the Queensland State of Origin Team

Statistics

NRL

Super League

State of Origin

Coaching

Footnotes

External links
 FOGS profile

1980 births
Living people
Australian rugby league players
Cronulla-Sutherland Sharks coaches
Cronulla-Sutherland Sharks players
Crusaders Rugby League players
Mackay Cutters players
North Queensland Cowboys coaches
North Queensland Cowboys players
Queensland Rugby League State of Origin players
Rugby league centres
Rugby league players from Queensland